Moise Atsu Pomaney (born March 22, 1945) is a retired Olympic track and field athlete from Ghana. He specialized in the long jump and the triple jump.

Pomaney represented Ghana at the 1972 Olympic Games held in Munich, Germany. He claimed the bronze medal in the men's triple jump event at the 1974 British Commonwealth Games held in Christchurch, New Zealand with a jump of 16.23 metres (also a personal best for the event).

Moise Atsu Pomaney was inducted into the National Athletics Intercollegiate Association (NAIA) Track and Field Hall of Fame in 1991. Moises was also a member of  the 1971 Pan-African Track and Field team.

References

1945 births
Living people
Ghanaian male triple jumpers
Ghanaian male long jumpers
Commonwealth Games bronze medallists for Ghana
Athletes (track and field) at the 1974 British Commonwealth Games
Olympic athletes of Ghana
Athletes (track and field) at the 1972 Summer Olympics
Commonwealth Games medallists in athletics
African Games bronze medalists for Ghana
African Games medalists in athletics (track and field)
Athletes (track and field) at the 1973 All-Africa Games
20th-century Ghanaian people
21st-century Ghanaian people
Medallists at the 1974 British Commonwealth Games